The Macau women's national football team represents Macau in international women's association football and is governed by Macau Football Association (MFA).

History
The national federation became a FIFA affiliate in 1979.

As of June 2017, the team was not ranked in the world by FIFA.

The country's kit colours are red and green shirts, red or white shorts, and red or white socks.

The team's first match was on 22 July 2014 against the Guam national team, in which they lost 11–0.

Results and fixtures

The following is a list of match results, as well as any future matches that have been scheduled.

Legend

2014

2016

2017

2018

2019

Coaching staff

Current coaching staff

Manager history

Players

Current squad
The following players have been selected to the squad for the.

Recent call-ups
The following players have been called up to a squad in the past 12 months.

Records

*Active players in bold, statistics correct as of 2020.

Most capped players

Top goalscorers

Competitive record
FIFA Women's World Cup*Draws include knockout matches decided on penalty kicks.Olympic Games*Draws include knockout matches decided on penalty kicks.AFC Women's Asian Cup*Draws include knockout matches decided on penalty kicks.EAFF E-1 Football Championship*Draws include knockout matches decided on penalty kicks.''

See also

Sport in Macau
Football in Macau
Women's football in Macau
Macau men's national football team

References

External links
 Official website, macaufootballassociation.com 

Asian women's national association football teams